Antony McDonald is a British opera and theatre designer and director.

In 2013, McDonald won the Set Design Award at the International Opera Awards. He won the Golden Mask for best costume design in a musical production (Russia) for L'Enfant et les Sortileges at the Bolshoi Moscow, and the Irish Times Best Costume design award for Gerald Barry's opera The Importance of Being Earnest.

References

Living people
British theatre people
Year of birth missing (living people)